Thinolestris is a genus of flies in the family Dolichopodidae.

Species
Thinolestris luteola Grootaert & Meuffels, 1988 – Papua New Guinea
Thinolestris nigra Grootaert & Evenhuis, 2006 – Singapore, Malaysia, Brunei
Thinolestris obscura Grootaert & Meuffels, 1988 – Indonesia (North Sulawesi)
Thinolestris thaica Grootaert & Meuffels, 2001 – Thailand, Malaysia

References

Hydrophorinae
Dolichopodidae genera
Diptera of Asia
Diptera of Australasia
Insects of Oceania